Diversion is a 1927 play by the British writer John Van Druten. It was first staged in the United States at the Lyceum Theatre in Rochester before beginning a 68 run performance at the 49th Street Theatre in 1928. In London it ran for a combined 101 performances at the Arts Theatre and Little Theatre between 26 September and 22 December 1928. The cast included Maurice Evans, C.V. France, Cathleen Nesbitt and Mignon O'Doherty.

Film adaptation
In 1929 the play was adapted into a film The Careless Age by First National Pictures. It was directed by John Griffith Wray and starred Douglas Fairbanks Jr. and Carmel Myers.

References

Bibliography
 Goble, Alan. The Complete Index to Literary Sources in Film. Walter de Gruyter, 1999.
 Wearing, J. P. The London Stage 1920-1929: A Calendar of Productions, Performers, and Personnel. Rowman & Littlefield, 2014.

1927 plays
Plays by John Van Druten
Plays set in London
British plays adapted into films